Settlement on the 1st of May is a rural locality (a settlement) in Vereyskoye Rural Settlement of Orekhovo-Zuyevsky District, Russia. The population was 34 as of 2010. There are 53 streets.

Geography 
The settlement is located 18 km southeast of Orekhovo-Zuyevo (the district's administrative centre) by road. Snopok Novy is the nearest rural locality.

History 
The settlement was formed for peat extraction in the 20th century. Until 2006, it was a part of Vereisky rural district of Orekhovo-Zuevsky district.

References 

Rural localities in Moscow Oblast